Alessandro Gabbani (born 13 July 1999) is an Italian footballer who plays as a midfielder for Stetson Hatters.

Club career

Sampdoria 
He is a product of Sampdoria youth teams and started playing for their Under-19 squad in the 2016–17 season.

Loan to Vis Pesaro 
On 15 July 2018, Gabbani joined Serie C club Vis Pesaro on a season-long loan. On 4 November he made his professional debut Serie C for Vis Pesaro in a 2–0 away win over Virtus Verona as an 88th-minute substitute for Álex Pastor. On 22 December, Gabbani played his first match as a starter for the team, a 1–1 away draw against Rimini, he was replaced by Ibourahima Baldè in the 54th minute. Gabbani ended his season-long loan to Vis Pesaro with only 5 appearances, including 2 as a starter.

Arzignano
On 24 September 2020, he signed with Arzignano.

College career
On September 2021, he joined to Stetson Hatters, Stetson University in the United States.

Career statistics

Club

References

External links
 

1999 births
Living people
Footballers from Rome
Italian footballers
Association football midfielders
Serie C players
Serie D players
U.C. Sampdoria players
Vis Pesaro dal 1898 players
F.C. Arzignano Valchiampo players
Stetson Hatters men's soccer players
Italian expatriate footballers 
Italian expatriate sportspeople in the United States 
Expatriate soccer players in the United States